Huyghe Brewery is a brewery founded in 1906 by Leon Huyghe in city of Melle in East Flanders, Belgium. Its flagship beer is Delirium Tremens, a golden ale.

History
In 1906, Leon Huyghe purchased an existing brewery in Melle (at a site that had been in operation brewing beer since 1654).  The brewery adopted the present name in 1938.  While the company initially brewed a regular pilsner, it soon began brewing the kinds of beers now typically known as "Belgian."

Operations and products
The beers created at Huyghe included a series of beers under the "Delirium" tag that featured pink elephants on their labels.  The best known of these is Delirium Tremens, a blonde, Belgian ale.  Other beers brewed at Huyghe include a Christmas beer and a beer called "Deliria", selected to be brewed by the company from 65 entries made by women brewers.  In addition, the company makes a number of fruit beers with low ABV.

Huyghe has acquired several smaller Belgian breweries, including Arteveld Grand Cru in 1987, Brouwerij Biertoren in 1993,  in 1994, and Brouwerij Villers in 1999.

Selected beers
Delirium Nocturnum - 8.5% alcohol
Delirium Noël - a winter seasonal offering, 10.0% ABV.
Delirium Tremens - 8.5% alcohol
Named as "Best Beer in the World" in 2008 at the World Beer Championships in Chicago, Illinois. Stuart Kallen gives it the number one spot in his book, The 50 Greatest Beers in the World.

Gallery

See also
 Beer in Belgium

References

External links
 

Breweries of Flanders
Companies based in East Flanders
Melle, Belgium
Belgian companies established in 1906
Food and drink companies established in 1906